Aureolaria, with the common name false foxgloves, is a genus of 8 species, native to North America.

Aureolaria plants are hemiparasitic, which is a character that in part describes the family Orobanchaceae.

Until recently the genus was aligned with members of the family Scrophulariaceae.  As a result of numerous molecular phylogenetic studies based on various chloroplast DNA (cpDNA) loci, it was shown to be more closely related to members of the Orobanchaceae.

Species
Aureolaria flava
Aureolaria grandiflora
Aureolaria greggii
Aureolaria levigata
Aureolaria patula
Aureolaria pectinata
Aureolaria pedicularia
Aureolaria virginica

References

External links

 
Flora of North America
Orobanchaceae genera
Parasitic plants
Taxa named by Constantine Samuel Rafinesque